Jerry Saint-Vil (born 22 June 1995) is a Haitian footballer.

Early life
He moved to Port-au-Prince, Haiti when he was just a few months old. He moved back to the United States in 2012.

Career

Professional
Following a season with Tormenta FC in the PDL, Saint-Vil signed for the club professionally ahead of their first season in USL League One. He made his professional debut for the club on March 29, 2019 in a 1-0 home victory over Greenville Triumph SC.

In late February 2020, Saint-Vil was signed by Chattanooga FC of the National Independent Soccer Association.

References

External links
 
 
 Profile at PBA Athletics

1995 births
Living people
Haitian footballers
Haiti youth international footballers
Association football defenders
Palm Beach Atlantic Sailfish men's soccer players
People from Jupiter, Florida
Soccer players from Florida
Sportspeople from the Miami metropolitan area
Tormenta FC players
Chattanooga FC players
USL League One players
USL League Two players
National Independent Soccer Association players